Patto is the first studio album by the rock band Patto. It was released in 1970 on Vertigo Records.

Track listing

Personnel
 Mike Patto – vocals
 Ollie Halsall – lead guitar, acoustic guitar, piano, vibraphone
 Clive Griffiths – bass
 John Halsey – drums

Notes

1970 debut albums
Patto albums
Vertigo Records albums
Repertoire Records albums